The Origo gentis Romanae ("origin of the Roman people") is a short historiographic literary compilation. It narrates the origins of the Roman people. It starts with Saturn and finishes with Romulus. The work was earlier associated with Aurelius Victor, but it is no longer believed to be by his hand.

There are two manuscript copies of the Origo: MS 9755-63 in the Royal Library of Belgium in Brussels and MS Canon. Class. Lat. 131 in the Bodleian Library in Oxford. Both date to the fifteenth century.

Notes

Bibliography

External links
Anonymous: On the Origin of the Roman People, English translation at Tertullian.org

Classical Latin literature
History of Rome